The Honda H engine was Honda's larger high-performance engine family from the 1990s and early 2000s. It is largely derived from the Honda F engine with which it shares many design features. Like Honda's other 4-cylinder families of the 1980s and 1990s, It has also enjoyed some success as a racing engine, forming the basis of Honda's touring car racing engines for many years, and being installed in lightweight chassis (such as the Honda CR-X) for use in drag racing. The F20B is a part of the F-series family of engines; it is basically a cast-iron sleeved down destroked version of the H22A. It was developed by Honda to be able to enter into the 2-liter class of international racing.

H-Series consisted of two different displacements; H22  and H23 . Both versions were using the same block; different crankshafts and connecting rods were utilized to achieve displacement variation.

DOHC engines

H22
The H22 debuted in the U.S. in 1993 as the H22A1 for use in the Honda Prelude VTEC. Since then, versions of the H22 would become the Prelude's signature high-performance engine worldwide until the end of Prelude production in 2001. In 1994, Honda of Europe used the H22A cylinder head and the H22A engine block as the Formula 3 engine which was an H22A engine destroked from 2.2 liters to 2.0 liters (F3-2000cc) to compete in the European F3 series. It was then used by Mugen Motorsports as the F20B(MF204B) from 1997-2001. In 1995-1997, Honda of Europe used the same H22A-based F3 engine in the British Touring Car Championship (BTCC) Honda Accord. Also, in 1996-1997 Honda of Japan used the same H22A-based F3 engine in the Japan Touring Car Championship (JTCC) Honda Accord and won the JTCC for both years. Honda of Europe hired Neil Brown Engineering of England to convert the H22A engine into an F3 engine which would be later used in BTCC and JTCC.
The type S Prelude has an engine rev cut of 9100rpm.

Engine Specifications
 Bore × Stroke: 
 Displacement: 
 Valve Configuration: DOHC, 16 valves, VTEC
 Type: In-line 4 cylinder, aluminum block and head
 Compression ratio: 10.0-10.6:1 (North America); 10.0-11.0:1 (Europe); 10.6-11.0:1 (Japan)
 Max power: 
 VTEC Engagement: 5200 rpm
 Rev Cut: 8700 - 9100 rpm
 Engine Control System: Honda Systems PGM-FI with port fuel injection
 Valve Gear: Belt-driven dual overhead cams, 4 valves per cylinder, variable timing and lift
 92-96 versions use closed-deck blocks, while the 97-01 versions used open-deck blocks
 All h22 variants use FRM cylinder liners

H22A DOHC VTEC Japan only

Engine Block Serial Codes (~ = serial productions numbers i.e. 1, 2, 3, etc.)
Found in 1992-1996 Honda Prelude BB4-BB6
H22A-1000001~ Si Vtec; Si Vtec-4WS
H22A-1040001~ Si Vtec; Si Vtec-4WS
H22A-1100001~ Si Vtec; Si Vtec-S Limited; Si Vtec-4WS
H22A-1150001~ Si Vtec; Si Vtec-Sport Package; Si Vtec-4WS
H22A-1200001~ Si Vtec; Si Vtec-Sport Package R-2 (M/T); Si Vtec-Sport Package G-2 (A/T); Si Vtec-4WS
Found in 1994-1997 Honda Accord SiR Sedan CD-6
H22A-2000001~
H22A-2020001~
H22A-2050001~
H22A-2070001~
Found in 1997 Honda Accord SiR Wagon CF-2
 H22A-3030001~
Found in 1997-2001 Honda Prelude BB6-BB8
H22A-1250001~ SiR; SiR-4WS
H22A-4000001~ Type S
H22A-1270001~ SiR; SiR-4WS
H22A-4010001~ Type S
H22A-1280001~ SiR; SiR S spec; SiR-4WS
H22A-4020001~ Type S
H22A-1290001~ SiR; SiR S spec; SiR-4WS
H22A-4030001~ Type S
Found in 1999-2001 Honda Accord/Torneo Euro-R CL1
H22A-4000001~
H22A-4100001~

H22A
 Found in the Japanese 4th gen 1992-1996 Prelude Si VTEC (2WS BB4 & 4WS BB1). It produces  @ 6,800 rpm &  @ 5,500 rpm and comes with a black valve cover.
 Found in the Japanese 5th gen 1997-2001 Prelude SiR (2WS BB6 & 4WS BB8). It produces  @ 6,800 rpm &  @ 5,500 rpm and comes with a black valvecover.
 Found in the Japanese 5th gen 1997-2001 Prelude Type-S and SiR S-Spec (BB6). It produces  @ 7,200 rpm &  @ 6,500 rpm and comes with a red valvecover, more aggressive camshafts & mild porting on intake ports for more top end power.
 Found in the Japanese 5th gen 1994-1996 Accord SiR Sedan (CD6). It produces  @ 6,800 rpm &  @ 5,500 rpm and comes with a black valvecover.
 Found in the Japanese 5th gen 1997 Accord SiR Wagon (CF2). It produces  @ 6,800 rpm &  @ 5,500 rpm and comes with a black valvecover.
 Found in the Japanese 6th gen 1999-2001 Accord/Torneo Euro-R (CL1). It produces  @ 7,200 rpm &  @ 6,500 rpm and comes with a red valvecover.

H22A1
 Found in the American 4th gen Prelude VTEC (BB1). It produces  @ 6,800 rpm &  @ 5,500 rpm and comes with a black valvecover.
 Found in the Canadian 4th gen Prelude SR-V (BB1). It produces  @ 6,800 rpm &  @ 5,500 rpm and comes with a black valvecover.
 Found in the Australian 4th gen VTi-R (BB1). It produces  @ 6,800 rpm &  @ 5,500 rpm and comes with a black valvecover.

H22A2
 Found in the European 4th gen Prelude 2.2i VTEC (BB1). It produces  and comes with a black valvecover.

H22A3
 Found in the 1996 VTEC model (BB1) in various countries around the world denoted with regional code KU. It comes with a black valvecover.
 Found in the 1994 Honda Accord Coupe SiR with the CD8 chassis in countries like New Zealand. Built in the USA yet sold only overseas. Reputedly  peak output.

H22A4
 Found in the American 5th gen Prelude Base and Type-SH (BB6). It produces  @ 7,000 rpm &  @ 5,250 rpm and comes with a black valvecover.
 Found in the Canadian 5th gen Prelude Base, Type-SH, and SE (BB6). It produces  @ 7,000 rpm &  @ 5,250 rpm and comes with a black valvecover.
 Found in the Australian 1997-1998 Prelude VTi-R and VTi-R ATTS (BB6). It produces  @ 7,000 rpm &  @ 5,250 rpm and comes with a black valvecover.

H22A5
 Found in the European 1997-1998 Prelude 2.2VTi/VTi-S (2WS BB6 & 4WS BB8). It produces  and comes with a black valvecover.

H22A7
 Found in the European 1998-2002 Accord Type-R (CH1). It produces  @ 7,200 rpm and  @ 6,700 rpm and comes with a red valvecover.

H22A8
 Found in the European 1999-2001 Prelude 2.2VTi/VTi-S (2WS BB6 & 4WS BB8). It produces  @ 7,100 rpm &  @ 5,250 rpm and comes with a red valvecover.

H22Z1
 Found in the Australian 1999-2001 VTi-R and VTi-R ATTS (BB6). It comes with a Black valve cover on the normal VTi-R but on the VTi-R ATTS it comes with a Red valve cover, according to the Prelude owner manual the h22z1 (Misspelled as h22z2) has a compression ratio of 11.0:1 which is the same as the h22A found in the JDM Prelude type s.

H23
The H23 was an increased-stroke, non-VTEC version of the H22, used in Japan, North America, and Europe. It shared the same Fiber Reinforced Metal (FRM) cylinder wall liners with the H22.

Specifications
 Bore × Stroke: 
 Displacement: 
 Valve Configuration: DOHC, 16 valves
 Type: In-line 4 cylinder, aluminum block and head
 Compression ratio: 9.8:1
 Max power: 
 Max torque: 
 Redline: 6500rpm
 Engine Control System: Honda Systems PGM-FI with port fuel injection
 Valve Gear: belt-driven dual overhead cams, 4 valves per cylinder

H23A1
 Found in the American 4th gen Prelude Si (BB2). It produces  &  and comes with a "black top".
 Found in the American 1995 Prelude SE (BB2). It produces  &  and comes with a "black top".
 Found in the Canadian 4th gen Prelude SR (BB2). It produces  &  and comes with a "black top".
 Found in the Australian 4th gen Prelude Si (BB2). It produces  &  and comes with a "black top".
 Found in the Australian 1991-1993 Prelude SRS (BB2). It produces  &  and comes with a "black top".

H23A2
 Found in the European 4th gen Prelude 2.3i (BB2). It produces  &  and comes with a "black top".

H23A3
 Found in the European 1993-1995 Accord 2.3i SR (CC7). It produces  &  and comes with a "black top".
 Found in the European 1993-1999 Rover 623 SLi, GSi, and iS. It produces  &  and comes with a "black top".

H23A DOHC VTEC

In 1998, Honda of Japan produced a rare DOHC VTEC version of the H23A engine for use in Japan only. It has been factory modified with an internal oil passage in the H23A block to operate the VTEC solenoid in the H22A head. It has the same horsepower rating as the H22A engine but a lower redline of 7200rpms  because it has a longer stroke than the H22A. The H23A DOHC VTEC has  (bore and stroke) and the H22A DOHC VTEC has  (bore and stroke). It also lacked the oil squirters found on the H22A and H22Z VTEC engines, but there are provisions for the oil squirters to be installed, as the main oil galley feeding the squirters has been tapped, the holes for the bolts that hold the squirters at the bottom of each bore have been tapped. Installation of the squirters is possible but the actual squirters need to be bent to clear the larger stroke crank of the H23A VTEC engine. The H23A DOHC VTEC Engine is largest displacement in the H Series engines with a compression ratio of 10.6:1.

 Found in the Japanese 1998-2002 Accord Wagon SiR (CH9). It produces  @ 6,800 rpm &  @ 5,300 rpm and comes with a "blue top".
 Found in the Japanese 1998-2002 Accord Wagon AWD (CL2). It produces  @ 6,800 rpm &  @ 5,300 rpm and comes with a "blue top".

Below is a chart that consists all of the engines in the H Series.

H Series Motor Specifications Chart 1

H Series Motor Specifications Chart 2

H Series Motor Specifications Chart 3

See also
 List of Honda engines

Notes

H engine
Straight-four engines
Gasoline engines by model